Longju Road is a station under construction on the Line 14 of the Shanghai Metro. Located at the intersection of Longju Road and Pudong Avenue in Pudong, the station is expected to open after the rest of Line 14 due to difficulties in land acquisition.

References 

Railway stations in Shanghai
Shanghai Metro stations in Pudong
Line 14, Shanghai Metro